Liz Figueroa (born February 9, 1951) is an American politician who served as a member of the California State Legislature from 1994 to 2006. She is known for being the first Latina from Northern California to be elected to the Legislature.

Early life and education 
Figueroa was born and raised in San Francisco. She attended the College of San Mateo and University of California, Berkeley.

Career 
From 1994 to 1998, Figueroa served in the California State Assembly, representing the 20th District. In 1998, she was elected to the California State Senate, replacing Bill Lockyer. She served as a member of the California State Senate, representing the 10th district.

As a legislator, Figueroa worked on consumer and health-related issues. She authored legislation requiring insurance companies to cover replacement of children's car seats after collisions, and funding legislation for the San Francisco Bay Trail.

In 2002, Figueroa introduced California Shine the Light law, a bill addressing business practices when disclosing customer's personal information to third parties, a practice known as "list brokerage." In April 2004, Figueroa garnered national attention when she proposed a bill (S.B. 1822) aimed at limiting Google's Gmail service from providing ads to users based in part on the content of their emails. After a few months negotiating with privacy groups and Google, Figueroa abandoned the effort.

Figueroa ran for lieutenant governor of California in 2006. In the June 6, 2006, primary election, against fellow state senator Jackie Speier and Insurance Commissioner John Garamendi. Figueroa received 18% of the vote. Speier received 39%, while Garamendi won the primary with 42%.

After leaving office, Figueroa was appointed by California Senate President Don Perata in 2007 to the California Unemployment Insurance Appeals Board.

She is now working for Planned Parenthood Mar Monte as vice president of public affairs.

References

External links
California Unemployment Insurance Appeals Board
Join California Liz Figueroa

1951 births
Living people
California state senators
Members of the California State Assembly
People from Alameda County, California
Women state legislators in California
San Francisco Bay Area politicians
American politicians of Salvadoran descent
21st-century American politicians
21st-century American women politicians